Tonj North County is an administrative area in Warrap State, South Sudan. 

Administrative divisions

Tonj North was divided into 9 Payams previously before the creation of 32 states but even currently the county has 16 payams. However, when Tonj State was part of 32 states, the former payams of Tonj North were upgraded to County statuses. However, Tonj State government had split Warrap County into Warrap and Awul Counties and Lou Mawien Ariik was further divided into Alabek and Majak Counties. When President Salva Kiir dissolved the 32 states all the Counties got reduced to Payams. Furthermore, the Governor Aleu Ayieny Aleu of Warrap State has created more payams in Tonj North County 
 
Tonj North County is divided into:
 Lou North Payam
 Alabek Payam
 Majak Payam 
 Akop Payam
 Awul Payam
 Kirik Payam
 Patei Payam
 Abilnyang Payam
 Rorkou Payam
 Manloor Payam 
 Makuok Payam
 Pankot Payam
 Warrap Payam
 Marial Lou Payam
 Pagol Payam
 Rualbet Payam
       
The dispute over the two names of Alabek and Lou Ariik Payams:
 
Lou Mawien Ariik Community is sometimes called as Lou Ariik Community and the administrative name for this community is called Alabek Payam with its headquarter at Alabek. An attempt of changing administrative name from Alabek Payam to Lou Ariik County or Lou County or Lou Center in 2016, 2019 and 2022 by community politicians has been rejected by majority of the community and this has created political wrangling between the groups. Until today the Payam is still named Alabek despite illegal attempts from those groups until the entire community sit for another conference for more talks. 
Lou Mawien Ariik Community which is Alabek Payam is bordering Mayom County of unity state to the north, Akop Payam to the east, Rualbet Payam to south, Konggor Community to the west and Gogrial East to the northwest. 

Tonj North was part of former Tonj County until 2003 when Dr John Garang split Tonj County into three. 
The following are the name of commissioners who have been the appointed to govern from the inception to the current

Names of Commissioners:
 Lewis Anei Madut Kuendit - 2004
 Akol Koor Kuc  - from 2004 to 2005
 Acuil Akol Magardit - from 2007 to 2008
 Yol Mayar Mareng 
 Deng Ayieny Aleu 
 Diu Ayii Kon - from 2008 to 2013
 Marko Awuoc Kuot - from 2013 to 2014
 Sigin Ayii Kuot - from 2015 to 2016
 Kuol Akoon Kuol - 2021 to May 2022

References

Warrap (state)
Counties of South Sudan